Kung'u Ndung'u is a Kenyan civil engineer and business executive who was appointed as the Director-General of the Kenya National Highways Authority (KeNHA), effective 8 October 2021. He replaced Peter Mundinia who retired. Before his current assignment, Kung'u was the Director of Road Asset and Corridor Management at KeNHA.

Early life and education
Kung'u was born circa 1972. He attended Kenyan primary and secondary schools. He was admitted to the University of Nairobi to study civil engineering, graduating in 1997 with a Bachelor of Science in Civil Engineering. Later, he was awarded an Executive Master of Business Administration (Executive MBA), by Jomo Kenyatta University.

Career
Kung'u has spent most of his professional career at KeNHA. He is reported to have overseen the construction of the Dongo Kundu Bypass Highway, the Mwache Bridge Project and the Kitui–Kibwezi Road Project, among others.

It is reported that during the interview for his current position, he demonstrated "wide knowledge" of roads engineering and showed evidence of "leadership and management abilities". He is reported to possess a number of leadership skills, including "prudent financial management, human resource management and good governance".

On 8 October he was appointed as director general at KeNHA for a three-year term, renewable once, if he performs satisfactorily.

Other considerations
Kung'u Ndung'u was named employee of the year in 2017, at Kenya National Highways Authority.

References

External links
 Official website of KeNHA

1972 births
Living people
Kikuyu people
Kenyan engineers
Kenyan businesspeople
University of Nairobi alumni
Kenyan business executives
Kenyan chief executives